Aleksandar Simčević (born 15 February 1987) is a Serbian professional football player who plays for Železničar Pančevo.

Career

Club
On 24 July 2019, FC Taraz announced the signing of Simčević until the end of the 2019 season.

On 11 February 2020, Simčević signed for FC Ordabasy.

On 1 February 2022, Simčević joined Železničar Pančevo.

References

1987 births
Living people
Sportspeople from Kruševac
Serbian footballers
Serbian expatriate footballers
OFK Beograd players
FK Mačva Šabac players
FK Dinamo Vranje players
FK Hajduk Kula players
FK Jagodina players
FK Olimpik players
FC Mordovia Saransk players
FC Shakhter Karagandy players
FC Ordabasy players
FC Aktobe players
FC Taraz players
FK Železničar Pančevo players
Russian Premier League players
Kazakhstan Premier League players
Serbian SuperLiga players
Russian First League players
Premier League of Bosnia and Herzegovina players
Serbian expatriate sportspeople in Bosnia and Herzegovina
Serbian expatriate sportspeople in Russia
Serbian expatriate sportspeople in Kazakhstan
Expatriate footballers in Bosnia and Herzegovina
Expatriate footballers in Russia
Expatriate footballers in Kazakhstan
Association football defenders